Edward Hudson (1743 – 4 October 1821) was an Irish dentist, born in Castlemartyr, County Cork, Ireland.

Biography
Hudson was an eminent dentist, at a time when dentistry was still very much a fledgling practice. He created a "Preservative and other Dentifrices" for the bettering of dental hygiene during his time as a dentist.

Edward Hudson lived and practiced in Grafton Street, Dublin, and latterly lived at The Hermitage in Rathfarnham, Dublin (known in Edward's time as Fields of Odin, and subsequently as St. Enda's). This grand building on the outskirts of Dublin is now the home of the Pearse Museum, which celebrates the life of Patrick Pearse.

During his time at The Hermitage, Hudson built several ruins along the edge of the grounds, which remain to this day. The ruins were deliberately built as such from new, using rough stone to create the impression that they had existed for many years. These include a small Watchtower (fortification), a hermit's cave, a dolmen and a ruined abbey.

Amongst other vocations, Hudson was a director of the Grand Canal of Ireland, a scientific experimenter and philosopher, and a publisher of several anonymous scientific and political treatises.

Hudson was the uncle of Robert Blake, the first State Dentist of Ireland, who was inspired to become a Dentist by his uncle. Edward's son Henry Philerin Hudson subsequently succeeded Dr Blake as State Dentist.

In addition to his residences in Dublin, Hudson also owned The Manor in Glenville, County Cork, which he purchased sometime between 1776 and 1788. Edward Hudson is buried in Glenville Churchyard, along with other members of the Hudson family including his son William Elliott Hudson, the composer and collector of ancient Irish music.

It was Hudson's wish that when buried, his grave in the small churchyard at Glenville would be covered by:

"a hollow cone or Pyramid [...] for the purporse of performing therein my invented experiments on the Pendulum for elucidating the Phenomena and motions of Comets, Planets and Satellites; also my new theory of the Pendulum and that of falling bodies & many other things [...]"

Sadly, such a cone was never built, and the £500 left for this purpose must have gone to an alternative use.

Published works

Hudson, Edward (anonymous — dedication signed "A Patrician"; (1788). Ode on St Cecilia’s Birthday, J. Jones, Dublin.

References

 (1820, 1823) Almanac Registry Directory of Dublin.
(1822). Prerogative Will of Edward Hudson. National Archives, Kew, London.

Irish dentists
People from County Cork
1743 births
1821 deaths